Kampong Bukit is a remote village in Tutong District, Brunei, about  from the district town Pekan Tutong. The population was 674 in 2016. It is one of the villages within Mukim Ukong, a mukim subdivision in the district.

Facilities 
Kampong Bukit Primary School is the village primary school. It also shares grounds with Kampong Bukit Religious School, the village school for the country's Islamic religious primary education.

The village mosque is Kampong Bukit Mosque; it was built in 1997 and can accommodate 200 worshippers.

References 

Bukit